Roman Aleksandrovich Polovov (born 9 February 1990) is a former Russian professional footballer.

Club career
He made his professional debut in the Russian Second Division in 2007 for FC Olimpia Volgograd.

References

External links
 

1990 births
Living people
Russian footballers
Association football defenders
FC Olimpia Volgograd players
PFC Krylia Sovetov Samara players
FC Kuban Krasnodar players
FC Energiya Volzhsky players
FC Khimik-Arsenal players
Russian Premier League players
Russian expatriate footballers
Expatriate footballers in Kazakhstan